Mbooni Constituency is an electoral constituency in Kenya. It is one of six constituencies in Makueni County. The constituency was established for the 1966 elections. The elected representative is a Member of the Kenya National Assembly. The current Member of National Assembly is Honorable Erastus Kivasu.

Members of Parliament

Locations and wards

References

External links 
Mbooni Constituency
Map of the constituency

Constituencies in Makueni County
Constituencies in Eastern Province (Kenya)
1966 establishments in Kenya
Constituencies established in 1966